Khardi is a railway station on the Central line of the Mumbai Suburban Railway network. Thansit is the previous stop and Umbermali is the next stop. All suburban services terminating at, and departing from, Kasara, halt at this station.

Railway stations in Thane district
Mumbai Suburban Railway stations
Mumbai CR railway division
Kalyan-Igatpuri rail line